Francesco La Rosa (9 December 1926 – 8 April 2020) was an Italian footballer who played as a forward. He competed in the men's tournament at the 1952 Summer Olympics.

References

External links
 

1926 births
2020 deaths
Italian footballers
Italy international footballers
Olympic footballers of Italy
Footballers at the 1952 Summer Olympics
Association football forwards
Aurora Pro Patria 1919 players
Palermo F.C. players
Sondrio Calcio players
Footballers from Sicily
Sportspeople from Messina
Deaths from the COVID-19 pandemic in Lombardy